Breidnes Peninsula is a rocky peninsula,  long and  wide, between Ellis Fjord and Langnes Fjord in the Vestfold Hills. It was mapped by Norwegian cartographers from air photos taken by the Lars Christensen Expedition (1936–37) and named "Breidneset" (the "broad promontory").

References 

Peninsulas of Antarctica
Landforms of Princess Elizabeth Land
Ingrid Christensen Coast